The 2015 Colorado Springs mayoral election took place on  April 7 and May 19, 2015, to elect the mayor of Colorado Springs, Colorado. The election was held concurrently with various other local elections. The election was officially nonpartisan.

Incumbent Mayor Steve Bach, in office since 2011, announced that he would not seek a second term in office.

Since no candidate won a majority of the vote, a runoff was held on May 19 between Mary Lou Makepeace and John Suthers, the top two finishers in the April general election. Suthers defeated Makepeace in the runoff to become Mayor.

Candidates
 Tony Carpenter, perennial candidate
 Moses Humes (as a write-in candidate)
 Amy Lathen, El Paso County Commissioner
 Mary Lou Makepeace, former Mayor
 Lawrence Martinez, community activist
 Joel Miller, former City Councilman
 John Suthers, former Colorado Attorney General

Disqualified
 Justine Herring, real estate broker

Declined
 Steve Bach, incumbent Mayor
 Richard Skorman, former City Councilman and candidate for Mayor in 2011

General election

Polling

Endorsements

Results

Runoff election

Candidates
 Mary Lou Makepeace, former Mayor
 John Suthers, former Colorado Attorney General

Results

References

2015
2015 Colorado elections
2015 United States mayoral elections